Robert Carroll Nye (October 4, 1901 – March 17, 1974) was an American film actor. He appeared in more than 50 films between 1925 and 1944. His most memorable role was Frank Kennedy, Scarlett's second husband, in Gone with the Wind.

Biography
Nye was born in Akron, Ohio. His mother, Myra Nye, was the club editor of the Los Angeles Times; his father, W. P. Nye, was postmaster in Covina, California. Nye attended Covina, California, schools and the University of California at Los Angeles and later became a reporter and radio editor with the Times like his mother. 

Nye performed on stage at the Majestic Theater in Los Angeles from 1922 to 1925. He began working in films in June 1925. At the beginning of his career he had a score of leading man roles in Hollywood opposite such silent screen stars as Anita Page and Corinne Griffith. In his late career, he played usually small roles. His most memorable appearance was as Frank Kennedy, Scarlett's second husband and former love interest of her sister, in Gone with the Wind (1939). His film career ended in 1944 with an uncredited role in Wilson. Nye also worked with Groucho Marx at CBS.

After his film career, Nye served as a Hollywood journalist and publicity man. He married actress Helen Lynch in February 1928, and after her death he married Dorothy Nye, mentioned on his gravestone at Forest Lawn Memorial Park, Hollywood Hills. Nye died of a heart attack on March 17, 1974, in Encino, California.

Partial filmography

 Three of a Kind (1925) - Don Gray
 Classified (1925) - Mart Comet
 The Earth Woman (1926) - Steve Tilden
 The Impostor (1926) - Dick Gilbert
 The Wolf Hunters (1926) - Roderick Drew
 Her Honor, the Governor (1926) - Bob Fenway
 Kosher Kitty Kelly (1926) - Barney Kelly
 Women's Open Golf Championship (1927) - Dave Sullivan
 The Brute (1927) - The El
 The Black Diamond Express (1927) - Fred
 The Heart of Maryland (1927) - Lloyd Calvert
 The Rose of Kildare (1927) - Larry Nunan
 Death Valley (1927) - Boy
 The Silver Slave (1927) - Larry Martin
 The Girl from Chicago (1927) - Bob Carlton
 Little Mickey Grogan (1927) - Jeffrey Shore
 A Race for Life (1928) - Robert Hammond
 The Sporting Age (1928) - Phillip Kingston
 Powder My Back (1928) - Jack Hale
 Rinty of the Desert (1928) - Pat
 Craig's Wife (1928) - John Fredericks
 The Perfect Crime (1928) - Trevor
 While the City Sleeps (1928) - Marty
 Land of the Silver Fox (1928) - Carroll Blackton
 Jazzland (1928) - Homer Pew
 The Flying Fleet (1929) - Tex (uncredited)
 The Devil Bear (1929) - Bert Sifton
 The Squall (1929) - Paul
 The Girl in the Glass Cage (1929) - Terry Pomfret
 Light Fingers (1929) - Donald Madison
 Madame X (1929) - Darrell
 Confession (1929)
 The Bishop Murder Case (1930) - John E. Sprigg
 Sons of the Saddle (1930) - Harvey
 The Lottery Bride (1930) - Nels
 King of the Wild (1931) - Tom Armitage
 The Lawless Woman (1931) - Allan Perry
 Hell-Bent for Frisco (1931) - Lane Garwood
 The One Way Trail (1931) - Terry Allen
 Neck and Neck (1931) - Frank Douglas
 Temptation's Workshop (1932)
 The Wolf Dog (1933) - Radio Announcer
 Traveling Saleslady (1935) - Burroughs
 The Crime of Dr. Forbes (1936) - Radio Announcer (uncredited)
 Sing, Baby, Sing (1936) - Radio Announcer (uncredited)
 Don't Turn 'Em Loose (1936) - Police Radio Broadcaster (uncredited)
 Mind Your Own Business (1936) - Radio Announcer (uncredited)
 We Who Are About to Die (1937) - Police Radio Dispatcher (uncredited)
 Sing and Be Happy (1937) - Announcer (uncredited)
 Hot Water (1937) - Radio Announcer (uncredited)
 Saturday's Heroes (1937) - First Football Broadcaster (uncredited)
 City Girl (1938) - Radio Commentator (uncredited)
 Rebecca of Sunnybrook Farm (1938) - Radio Announcer
 Kentucky Moonshine (1938) - Radio Announcer
 Safety in Numbers (1938) - Larsen
 The Main Event (1938) - Fight Announcer (uncredited)
 Hold That Co-ed (1938) - Radio Newscaster (uncredited)
 Gone with the Wind (1939) - Frank Kennedy - A Guest
 The Trail Blazers (1940) - Jim Chapman
 Blossoms in the Dust (1941) - Mr. Loring, Dora's Husband (uncredited)
 Wilson (1944) - Reporter (uncredited)

References

External links

Monty Westmore applying makeup on Carroll Nye for Gone with the Wind

1901 births
1974 deaths
20th-century American male actors
Deaths from kidney failure
American male film actors
American male silent film actors
American male radio actors
Male actors from Akron, Ohio
Radio and television announcers
Burials at Forest Lawn Memorial Park (Hollywood Hills)
Metro-Goldwyn-Mayer contract players
University of California alumni